Pope Agrippinus was the 10th Pope and Patriarch of Alexandria.

When Pope Celadion died, Bishop Agrippinus was chosen Patriarch by the people and clergy of Alexandria.

According to Coptic tradition, Anba Agrippinus did not own any silver or gold, except for what met his basic personal needs.

Aggrippinus died after a reign of 12 years. He is commemorated on the 5th day of Meshir in the Coptic Synaxarium.

References 

General

Atiya, Aziz S. The Coptic Encyclopedia. New York: Macmillan Publishing Co., 1991.

External links 
 The Official website of the Coptic Orthodox Pope of Alexandria and Patriarch of All Africa on the Holy See of Saint Mark the Apostle
 Coptic Documents in French

178 deaths
2nd-century Popes and Patriarchs of Alexandria
2nd-century Christian saints
Saints from Roman Egypt
Year of birth unknown